Brice Leverdez (born 9 April 1986) is a French badminton player. He was a champion at the 2013 Mediterranean Games, won a silver medal at the 2015 European Games, and a bronze medal at the 2018 European Championships.

Career 
Leverdez started playing badminton at aged 12, and continued after that at the club, then in 2008, he joined France national badminton team. In 2005, he won bronze medal at the European Junior Badminton Championships in boys' doubles event partnered with Matthieu Lo Ying Ping. He won French National Badminton Championships in men's singles event from 2008 to 2015. In 2012, he competed in men's singles event at the Summer Olympic Games held in London. During group stage, he had defeated Edwin Ekiring 21-12, 21-11, but was defeated by Wong Wing Ki 21-11, 21-16. He finished second place in group stage, and did not advance. In 2013, he won gold medal at the Mediterranean Games in men's singles event.
In 2016, he won silver medal at the European Men's Team Championships in men's team event. In the same year, he competed at the Summer Olympic Games held in Rio de Janeiro, Brazil. In the group stage, he defeating Raul Must 21-18, 18-21, 21-12, and defeated by Jan Ø. Jørgensen 21-11, 21-18. He did not advance to the final stage after finished second in group stage.

In February, Leverdez won his ninth National Championships title. He qualified to represent France at the 2019 European Games in Minsk, Belarus. He finished as the runner-up and won a silver medal after being defeated by Anders Antonsen in the final with the score 19–21, 21–14, 10–21.

Achievements

European Games 
Men's singles

European Championships 
Men's singles

Mediterranean Games 
Men's singles

European Junior Championships 
Boys' doubles

BWF Grand Prix (1 title, 2 runners-up) 
The BWF Grand Prix had two levels, the Grand Prix and Grand Prix Gold. It was a series of badminton tournaments sanctioned by the Badminton World Federation (BWF) and played between 2007 and 2017.

Men's singles

  BWF Grand Prix Gold tournament
  BWF Grand Prix tournament

BWF International Challenge/Series (13 titles, 3 runners-up) 
Men's singles

Men's doubles

  BWF International Challenge tournament
  BWF International Series tournament
  BWF Future Series tournament

References

External links 
 Brice Leverdez's official site
 

French male badminton players
1986 births
Living people
People from La Garenne-Colombes
Sportspeople from Hauts-de-Seine
Badminton players at the 2012 Summer Olympics
Badminton players at the 2016 Summer Olympics
Olympic badminton players of France
Competitors at the 2013 Mediterranean Games
Mediterranean Games gold medalists for France
Mediterranean Games medalists in badminton
Badminton players at the 2019 European Games
European Games silver medalists for France
European Games medalists in badminton
Badminton players at the 2020 Summer Olympics
21st-century French people